Wohib Masresha (born 19 April 1946) is an Ethiopian long-distance runner. He competed in the men's 5000 metres at the 1968 Summer Olympics.

References

1946 births
Living people
Athletes (track and field) at the 1968 Summer Olympics
Athletes (track and field) at the 1972 Summer Olympics
Ethiopian male long-distance runners
Olympic athletes of Ethiopia
Place of birth missing (living people)
20th-century Ethiopian people